The Régiolis is a category of multiple unit train built by Alstom coming from the Coradia family. The first train was presented on July 4, 2013 in Aquitaine, and the first commissioning took place on April 22, 2014 on the TER Aquitaine network, more than a year behind the initial schedule.

History

The versatile carrier 

In the 2000s, the delivery of several hundred new trains, X TER, A TER, AGC, or TER 2N NG provided significant modernizations of the regional electrical and diesel fleet. However, in the early 2010s, old types of rolling stock dating from the 1970s and 1980s continued to operate, it became necessary to continue the renewal and growth of the fleet during the period 2013 - 2022 due increasing TER network usage. This desire manifested itself with a call for tenders from SNCF, for the design of a new type of train, the "versatile carrier" ("porteur polyvalent" in French). Following the Grenelle Environnement and the successful usage of AGC dual-mode equipment, this equipment must not only have a diesel version, but electrical and dual-mode versions, to avoid any usage of the diesel engines where overhead catenary is available.

While Bombardier Transportation won a few years ago the contract for 700 AGC trains for the TER, Alstom won the contract this time, allowing the manufacturer to manufacture new equipment for French regional traffic. The imagined train, the Régiolis, is offered in electric and dual-mode-bicurrent version, allowing these trains to run on the entire French normal-gauge network, like the B 82500 of the competing manufacturer Bombardier. In addition, a tricurrent version with 15 kV at a frequency of 16.7 Hz is also available, allowing cross-border services to Germany and Switzerland. The Régiolis is presented as "a modular train that knows how to do everything" and proposed in three versions with three, four or six coaches, and three types of development, peri-urban, regional or intercity. Like the manufacturer's AGV, or Bombardier Z 50000 and Regio 2N, the train is designed with an articulated architecture, with the bogies arranged between the cars.

Orders 
The first eight regions to order the Regiolis were Alsace, Aquitaine, Lower Normandy, Upper Normandy, Lorraine, Midi-Pyrénées, Pays de la Loire and Picardie. The order for Lower Normandy, made in 2009, covers 15 trains for a total of 148 million of euros

Distribution of Orders

Operators and Routes

Intercités 

 Nantes - Bordeaux
 Nantes - Lyon
 Paris - Granville
 Paris - Boulogne-sur-Mer
 Clermont-Ferrand - Nîmes via Le Cévenol
 Bourges - Montluçon
 Toulouse - Hendaye
 Bordeaux - Ussel
 Bordeaux - Limoges

TER

TER Auvergne-Rhône-Alpes 

 Clermont-Ferrand – Lyon
 Clermont-Ferrand – Moulins – Nevers 
 Clermont-Ferrand – Vic-le-Comte
 Clermont-Ferrand – Thiers 
 Clermont-Ferrand – Gannat
 Clermont-Ferrand – Brioude

Léman Express 

 L1 : Coppet – Genève – Annemasse – Thonon – Évian
 L2 : Coppet – Genève – Annemasse – La Roche-sur-Foron – Annecy
 L3 : Coppet – Genève – Annemasse – La Roche-sur-Foron – Saint-Gervais-Le Fayet
 L4 : Coppet – Genève – Annemasse 
 L5 : Genève – La Plaine
 L6 : Genève – Bellegarde

TCR Bourgogne-Franche-Comté 

 Dijon-Ville – Dole – Besançon-Viotte
 Besançon- Viotte – Belfort
 Belfort - Besançon-Viotte - Lons-le-Saunier - Bourg-en-Bresse - Lyon-Part-Dieu

TER Centre-Val de Loire 
 Bourges – Montluçon.

TER Grand Est

TER Alsace 
 Strasbourg – Molsheim – Barr - Saint-Dié-des-Vosges
 Strasbourg - Haguenau
 Mulhouse – Bâle
 Colmar - Metzeral
 Strasbourg – Mulhouse
 Strasbourg – Sarreguemines
 Strasbourg - Nancy / Metz.
 Strasbourg - Roeschwoog / Gare de Lauterbourg.

TER Lorraine 
 Épinal – Saint-Dié
 Nancy – Pont-St-Vincent – Contrexéville – Culmont-Chalindrey
 Nancy – Épinal – Belfort
 Nancy – Épinal – Remiremont
 Nancy – Lunéville – Saint-Dié

TER Hauts-de-France 

 Amiens – Laon
 Paris-Nord – Amiens – Boulogne
 Paris-Nord – Laon
 Amiens – Paris-Nord
 Amiens – Lille-Flandres
 Amiens – Calais-Ville

TER Normandie 
 Rouen – Dieppe

TER New Aquitaine 

 Bordeaux-Saint-Jean – Agen 
 Bordeaux-Saint-Jean – Langon
 Bordeaux-Saint-Jean – Hendaye
 Bordeaux-Saint-Jean – Pointe de Grave 
 Bordeaux-Saint-Jean – Pau
 Bordeaux-Saint-Jean – Coutras
 Bordeaux-Saint-Jean - Libourne - Coutras - Angouleme
 Tarbes – Hendaye
 La Rochelle – Poitiers
 La Rochelle – Bordeaux-Saint-Jean
 Bordeaux-Saint-Jean – Limoges
 Bordeaux-Saint-Jean – Ussel

TER Occitanie 

 Toulouse – Agen
 Toulouse – Carmaux
 Toulouse – Rodez
 Toulouse – Mazamet
 Toulouse – Latour-de-Carol - Enveitg
 Toulouse – Pau
 Toulouse – Auch
 Toulouse – Avignon-Centre
 Toulouse – Brive-la-Gaillarde.

TER Pays de la Loire 

 Nantes – Angers
 Nantes – Cholet
 Cholet – Angers
 Nantes – La Rochelle

TER Provence-Alpes-Côte d'Azur 

 Avignon-TGV – Avignon-Centre
 Marseille – Arles – Avignon-Centre
 Toulon – Marseille
 Marseille-Saint-Charles – Miramas via Port-de-Bouc

Senegal 
15 Trains Dakar - Airport

Future Operators and Routes

CDG Express 
The region Ile-de-France has not made orders for Regiolis trains. However, a link located only in this region, will operate by 2024 a dozen trains, specially designed for airport connections. These trains will be operated on the Charles de Gaulle Express, a new line directly connecting the Gare de Paris-Est to terminal 2 of the Paris Charles de Gaulle. These trains will be operated by a new company, bringing together Keolis (subsidiary of the SNCF) and the RATP.

 Paris Gare de-Est – Paris Charles de Gaulle Airport

Manufacturing and testing 
On December 1, 2011 three workers making adjustments on Alstom's private test track in Tronville-en-Barrois (Meuse) were killed by a train under test. This railway test center tests all Régiolis trains.

This train is manufactured at several Alstom sites:

 Design: Saint-Ouen
 Design and assembly: Reichshoffen
 Engines: Ornans
 Bogies: Le Creusot
 Traction chains: Tarbes
 Embedded computing: Villeurbanne

The Régiolis received approval for commercial operation, issued by the EPSF in March 2014. The first trains circulated in April 2014 in Aquitaine, Picardy, Lorraine and Alsace.

The width of Regiolis and Regio 2N is incompatible with the gauge available in a number of stations. About 1,300 edges of platforms have had to be retouched to clear a few extra centimeters, to allow the passage of these new trains. The cost of this operation is estimated at 50 million euros. While this kind of minimal adaptations of infrastructure to new equipment is routine, the lack of anticipation and the fear of higher prices raised controversy in May 2014.

The first Régiolis, a Z 51500 four car, was introduced into commercial service more than a year behind the initial forecasts on April 22, 2014 in Aquitaine, on the Bordeaux - Agen route. The same day, Lorraine put into commercial service its first two-mode regional train B 84500 between Nancy and Saint-Dié-des-Vosges. Finally, six days later, on April 28, Alsace put into service a bi-mode element peri-urban B 83500 between Strasbourg and Sarreguemines. A month later, May 26, it was the turn of Picardy to introduce its first B 84500 on the Paris-Nord - Laon route.

Incident 

As of May 7, 2018, all Regiolis (and Coradia Liner) trainsets are limited to the speed of the "V140" craft (imposing a speed limit of 140 km/h, as well as other speed reductions on certain portions). line). Indeed, during tests carried out in April, it was found, at 160 km/h, that the emergency braking distances exceeded those which allowed the approval of this type of equipment. This restriction, caused by premature aging of the brake linings which will therefore have to be replaced, should be lifted in October of the same year.

See also 

 List of SNCF classes

References

External links 

 Former official website
 SNCF - Déploiement 2014-2015 du Régiolis

SNCF multiple units
Alstom multiple units
Electric multiple units of France
Diesel multiple units of France
Hybrid multiple units of France
25 kV AC multiple units
15 kV AC multiple units
1500 V DC multiple units of France